Phtheochroa undulata is a species of moth of the family Tortricidae. It is found in the Ala-Tau mountains of Central Asia.

References

Moths described in 1962
Phtheochroa